Norton Anthology may refer to one of several literary anthologies published by W. W. Norton & Company.

List of Norton Anthologies
 The Norton Anthology of Native Nations Poetry
 The Norton Anthology of African American Literature
 The Norton Anthology of American Literature
 The Norton Anthology of Children's Literature: The Traditions in English
 The Norton Anthology of Contemporary Fiction
 The Norton Anthology of Drama
 The Norton Anthology of English Literature
 The Norton Anthology of Jewish American Literature
 The Norton Anthology of Latino Literature
 The Norton Anthology of Literature by Women
 The Norton Anthology of Modern and Contemporary Poetry
 The Norton Anthology of Poetry
 The Norton Anthology of Short Fiction
 The Norton Anthology of Theory and Criticism
 The Norton Anthology of Western Literature
 The Norton Anthology of World Literature
 The Norton Anthology of World Religions
 The Norton Reader: An Anthology of Nonfiction
 editors: Melissa Goldthwaite, Joseph Bizup, John Brereton, Anne Fernald, Linda Peterson
 14th edition with 2016 MLA updates, 2016, 1200 pages
 The Norton Reader, An Anthology of Expository Prose
 editors: Arthur M. Eastman and others
 3rd edition, 1973,

References

Anthology series
W. W. Norton & Company books